Yarsanism, Ahl-e Haqq or Kaka'i ( or ;), is a syncretic religion founded by Sultan Sahak in the late 14th century in western Iran. The total number of followers of Yarsanism is estimated to be over half a million to one million in Iran. The numbers in Iraq are unknown. Followers are mostly Kurds from the Guran, Sanjâbi, Kalhor, Zangana and Jalalvand tribes. Turkic-speaking Yarsan enclaves also exist in Iran.

Some Yarsanis in Iraq are called Kaka'i. Yarsanis say that some people call them disparagingly as "Ali-o-allahi" or "worshipers of Ali", labels which Yarsanis deny. Many Yarsanis hide their religion due to  the pressure of Iran's Islamic system, and there are no exact statistics of their population.

The Yarsanis have a distinct religious literature primarily written in the Gorani language. However, few modern Yarsani can read or write Gorani as their mother tongue is Southern Kurdish or Sorani.

Their central religious book is called the Kalâm-e Saranjâm, written in the 15th century and based on the teachings of Sultan Sahak.

Geography 
The majority of Yarsan followers live in Kermanshah Province and adjacent areas of Lorestan Province and Ilam Province in Iran. They are the predominant religious population in Mahidasht, Bivanij and Zohab districts of Kermanshah, and populate rural areas of Delfan, Holeylan and Posht-e Kuh in Ilam and Lorestan.

The main urban centers of the religion are Sahneh, Kerend-e Gharb and Gahvareh, and other important cities include Kermanshah, Sarpol-e Zahab and Qasr-e Shirin.

Other areas in Iran with a significant Yarsan population include Hashtgerd and Varamin near Tehran and Maragheh, and Tabriz in Iranian Azerbaijan, where important Turkic-speaking Yarsan communities live and use Turkic for many of their religious texts. The Yarsani tradition claims that all early communities used Gorani as their religious language, but that over time, some groups were forced to adopt a Turkic language closely akin to Azeri for all purposes, including religion.

In Iraq, Yarsan followers mainly live in Iraqi Kurdistan, around Mosul, Kirkuk, Kalar, Khanaqin, Erbil, Sulaymaniyah, and Halabja.

Beliefs

The Yarsani follow the mystical teachings of Sultan Sahak ( 14th-15th century). From the Yarsani point of view, the universe is composed of two distinct yet interrelated worlds: the internal (bātinī) and the external (zāhirī), each having its own order and rules. Although humans are only aware of the outer world, their lives are governed according to the rules of the inner world. This aspect of the Yarsani faith can be identified as Kurdish esoterism which emerged under the intense influence of Bātinī-Sufism during the last two centuries.

Among other important pillars of their belief system are that the Divine Essence has successive manifestations in human form (mazhariyyat) and the belief in transmigration of the soul (dunaduni in Kurdish). Yarasani believe that every man needs to do what is written within their holy book, the Kalâm-e Saranjâm, otherwise they are not part of Yarsan. There is no compulsion or exclusion in Yarsan – anyone who chooses to follow its precepts is welcome.

The Yarsani faith's features include millenarism, Innatism, egalitarianism, metempsychosis, angelology, divine manifestation and dualism.

Divine manifestations
The Yarsani are emanationists and incarnationists, believing that the Divine Essence has successive incarnations known as mazhariyyats (similar to the Hindu avatars). They believe God manifests one primary and seven secondary manifestations in each  epoch of the world, in either angel or human form. These seven persons are known as "Haft tan" which means "The Seven Persons"

The primary mazhariyyat of the First Epoch was the Divine Essence known as Khawandagar, who created the world.

The primary mazhariyyat of the Second Epoch was Ali ibn Abi Talib, the fourth Caliph and first imam of Shia Islam. This explains the alternative name for Yarsanis Ali-Allahi, 'Believers in the divinity of Ali'.

The primary mazhariyyat of the Third Epoch was Shah Khoshin.

In the Fourth Epoch, the primary mazhariyyat is held to be Sultan Sahak. It is said that his mother was Dayerak Rezbar or Khatun-e Rezbar, a Kurdish virgin of the Jaff tribe. While sleeping under a pomegranate tree a kernel of fruit fell into her mouth when a bird pecked the fruit directly over her. Sources vary on Rezbar’s marital life, some state that she lived her entire life celibate and unmarried while most state that she had married. Sources that claim she had married either contest her husband as being a Kurdish man named “Shaykh Isa” from a priestly line of the Barzanja tribe or an Arab Sayyid man. Whether either of these men even fathered Sahak is also contested among Yarsanis who believe she had married either one of them.

Haft Tan or seven persons
Each Epoch in Yarsani belief saw the appearance of the seven secondary divine manifestations or Haft Tan. In the First Epoch they appeared in their true angelic form, while in subsequent Epochs they appeared in human incarnations. The "Haft Tan" are charged with responsibility for the affairs of the internal realm.

The secondary mazhariyyats  of the First Epoch include the archangels Gabriel, Michael, Israfil and Azrael, and a female angelic being. 

The mazhariyyats of the Second Epoch include Salman, Qanbar, Muhammad, Nusayr (who is either Jesus Christ or Theophobus) and Bahlool. It also includes Fatimah, the daughter of Muhammad as the incarnation of the female angel.

The mazhariyyats of the Third Epoch include Shah Fazlullah Veli, Baba Sarhang Dudani and Baba Naous.

In the Fourth Epoch, the Haft Tan or 'seven persons' charged by Sultan Sahak with responsibility for the affairs of the inner realm consist of the following:

The "Haft Tan" (The Seven Archangels) are key figures in the Yarsani belief system and their history. The only female among them is Khatun-e Rezbar, the mother of Sultan Sahak.
 Pir Benjamin, considered the incarnation of the archangel Gabriel; he has the preceptor title to all Yarsanis (Monday)
 Pir Musi, the incarnation of the archangel Michael and known as the Recording angel (Tuesday)
 Mustafā Dawan, the incarnation of archangel Azrael (Wednesday)
 Sultan Sahak, the incarnation of Divine Essence (Thursday)
 Baba Yadegar, also known as "Ahmad" and "Reza" (Friday)
 Khatun-e Razbar (Saturday) 
 Dawud Koswar (David), also informally called Dawu; he is known as "Dalil" (in Kurdish) to all Yarsanis (Sunday)

These seven persons are known as "Haft tan" which means literally "The Seven Persons"

Holy texts
The traditions of the Yarsani are preserved in poetry known as Kalâm-e Saranjâm (The Discourse of Conclusion), divinely revealed narratives passed down orally through the generations. These traditions are said to have been written down by Pir Musi, one of the seven companions of Sultan Sahak (also the angel in charge of recording human deeds). The collection consists of the epochs of Khawandagar [God], ‘Alī, Shah Khoshin and Sultan Sahak, the different manifestations of divinity. The epoch of Shah Khoshin takes place in Luristan and the epoch of Sultan Sahak is placed in Hawraman near the Sirwan River, the land of the Goranî. Also important to the Goranî is the Daftar-e kezana-ye Perdivari (Book of the Treasure of Perdivar), a collection of twenty six mythological poems or kalams.

The sayings attributed to Sultan Sahak are written in Gorani Kurdish, the sacred language of the Ahl-e Haqq, which also is known as Hawrami dialects. However, few modern Yarsani can read or write Gorani as their mother tongues are Southern Kurdish and Sorani Kurdish, which belong to the other two branches of the Kurdish language family. Some Yarsani literature is written in the Persian language.

The older texts are called the Perdiwari texts, which date back to around the 15th or 16th centuries. The texts are called Perdiwari since Perdiwar is where Soltan Sahak had first founded the Yarsani community. The Perdiwari texts are attributed to writers from this first community of Yarsani believers. They include the following texts.
Dowre-ye Bābā Khoshin
Dowre-ye Bābā Nā’us
Dowre-ye Bohlul
Dowre-ye Bābā Jalil
Bābā Sarhang
Dowre-ye Soltān Sahāk
Kalām-e Ābedin
Kalām-e Ahmad
Daftar-e Dāmyāri
Šandarwi maramo (Kelim wa Duš)
Bārgah Bārgah
Dowre-ye Cheltan
Kamākanān
Zolāl Zolāl

Widely known non-Perdiwari texts are:
Daftar-e Sheykh Amir
Daftar-e Khān Almās
Daftar-e Ābedin Jāf
Daftar-e Ilbegi
Daftar of Qushchioghli
Daftars of other members of the group of ‘Twenty-Four Poets’, in Turkic (Azerbaijani)
Daftar-e Zu’l-Feqār
Daftar of the Thirty-Six Poets of the Period of Sayyed Brāke

Sacred sites 

Two important sanctuaries of the Yarsani are the tomb of Bābā Yādgār, about 40 km away from Sarpol-e Zahab in Kermanshah Province and the tomb of Dawoud at Zarde, about three kilometres east of Sarpol-e Zahab. Another important shrine is that of Sultan Suhak in Sheykhan, near Perdīvar bridge in Kermanshah Province. The tombs of Pir Benjamin and Pir Musi in the town of Kerend in Kermanshah Province, Iran are also important shrines.

Organisation

Khandans or spiritual houses
Yarsanism is organised into spiritual houses or Khandans, seven of which were established at the time of Sultan Sahak, and four afterwards, making eleven Khandans in all. The Khandans were established when, along with the Haft Tan, Sultan Sahak also formed the Haft Tawane, a group of seven holy persons charged with the affairs of the outer world. They were Say-yed Mohammad, Say-yed Abu'l Wafa, Haji Babusi, Mir Sur, Say-yed Mostafa, Sheykh Shahab al-Din and Sheykh Habib Shah. Each of the Haft Tawane was charged with responsibility for the guidance of a number of followers, and these followers formed the original seven Khandans, namely Shah Ebrahim, Baba Yadegar, Ali Qalandar, Khamush, Mir Sur, Sey-yed Mosaffa and Hajji Babu Isa. After Sultan Sahak's time another four  khandans were established, namely Atesh Bag, Baba Heydar, Zolnour and Shah Hayas.

Every Yarsani therefore belongs to one specific khandan, which is led by a spiritual leader called a say-yed, to whom each member must swear obedience.  The say-yed is the spiritual leader of the community and is normally present during the ceremonies attended by the followers. Say-yeds are the only ones allowed to have full access to the religious texts of Yarsanism, and have traditionally competed with each other to have the largest number of followers. The position of Say-yed is hereditary, being passed down through the generations from the original  founders. As the say-yed are considered spiritual 'parents', it is the tradition for them not to marry their followers.

Relationship with other religious groups

An excerpt from the French Review of the Muslim World describes the difficulty in nomenclature for Yarsanism and related Shi'ite mysticism. The English translation reads:

Relations with Islam
Ahl-e Haqq view Islam as a product of a cycle of divine essence, which was made manifest in Ali, and established the stage of shai'at (Islamic law). This was followed by the cycle of tariqat (Sufi teachings), then ma'rifat (Sufi gnosis), and finally the current cycle of haqiqat (Ultimate Truth), which was made manifest in Sultan Sahak. The final stage supersedes the previous ones, which frees Ahl-e Haqq from observing the shari'a rules incumbent on Muslims. Ahl-i Haqq class other Muslims as either Ahl-i Tashayyu (followers of Shi'ism) or Ahl-i Tasannun (followers of Sunnism). The Ahl-i Haqq neither observe Muslim rites, such as daily prayers and fasting during the month of Ramadan, nor share Islamic theology and sacred space, such as belief in the day of resurrection and sanctity of the mosque.

Extremist Sunni Islamic groups, such as the Islamic State of Iraq and the Levant and al-Qaeda, regard the followers of Yarsanism as unbelievers who have to convert to Islam or die. These militants have persecuted Yarsanis during the Iraq conflict, possibly prompting some Iraqi Yarsan community leaders to declare in 2013 that their people were actually Muslims to avoid sectarian attacks.

See also

Ali-Illahism
Yazidism
Yazdanism

References

Bibliography 

Collections of Yarsani texts published in Iran and Iraq:
Ṣafizāde, Ṣ. (1375/1996), Nāme-ye Saranjām yā Kalām-e Xazāne [The Book of Saranjām or the Kalām of the Treasury], Tehran.
Ḥosseyni, Sayyed M. (1382/2003), Dīwān-e Gewre [The Great Diwan], Kermanshah.
Ṭāheri, Ṭ. (2007, 2009), Saranjām, 2 Vols., Erbil.
Anonymous (copied 1387/2008), Daftar-e Diwān-e Gewre-ye Perdiwari [The Book of the Great Collection of Perdiwari (Kalāms)], copied by Kāki ‘Azizpanāhi Tutšāmi, n.pl.

External links

 
 
 Razbar Ensemble – sacred music of Ahl-e Haqq.
 Gorani Influence on Central Kurdish: Substratum or Prestige Borrowing? Leezenberg, Michiel: ILLC – Department of Philosophy, University of Amsterdam
 The Shabak and the Kakais in Northern Iraq, Syncretistic religious communities in the Near East: collected papers of the International Symposium "Alevism in Turkey and comparable sycretistic religious communities in the Near East in the past and present" Berlin, 14–17 April 1995, Krisztina Kehl-Bodrogi, Barbara Kellner-Heinkele, Anke Otter-Beaujean, Krisztina Kehl-Bodrogi, Barbara.
 Leezenberg, Michiel: ILLC – Department of Humanities, University of Amsterdam

 
Iranian religions
Kurdish culture
Monotheistic religions
Mysticism
Religion in Iran
Religion in Iraq
Religion in Kurdistan
Kurdish words and phrases